USS Francis Hammond (DE/FF-1067) is the sixteenth , named in honor of Hospitalman Francis Colton Hammond, a Medal of Honor recipient.

Construction 
She was originally designed as a Knox-class ocean escort (DE-1067), and was built by Todd Shipyards, Los Angeles Division, San Pedro, California. The ship's keel was laid on 15 July 1967. She was launched on 11 May 1968; sponsored by Mrs. Phyllis Hammond Smith (widow of Hospitalman Hammond). The ship was commissioned at Long Beach Naval Shipyard, Long Beach, California on 25 July 1970.

Design and description
The Knox-class design was derived from the  modified to extend range and without a long-range missile system. They displaced  at full load. Their crew consisted of 13 officers and 211 enlisted men.

The ships were equipped with one Westinghouse geared steam turbine that drove the single propeller shaft.

The Knox-class ships were armed with a 5"/54 caliber Mark 42 gun forward and a single 3-inch/50-caliber gun aft. They mounted an eight-round ASROC launcher between the 5-inch (127 mm) gun and the bridge. Close-range anti-submarine defense was provided by two twin  Mk 32 torpedo tubes. The ships were equipped with a torpedo-carrying DASH drone helicopter; its telescoping hangar and landing pad were positioned amidships aft of the mack. Beginning in the 1970s, the DASH was replaced by a SH-2 Seasprite LAMPS I helicopter and the hangar and landing deck were accordingly enlarged. Most ships also had the 3-inch (76 mm) gun replaced by an eight-cell BPDMS missile launcher in the early 1970s.

Service history
As part of the Navy's 1975 ship reclassification, Francis Hammond was reclassified as a frigate (FF-1067) on 30 June 1975.

In December 1986, after the ship's company of Francis Hammond raised over $11,000 for Navy Relief (beating their goal of ten times the ship's hull number), permission was granted to temporarily add a dollar sign, a thousands separator, and an extra zero to the hull number painted on the side of the ship.

Decommissioned 2 July 1992 in Long Beach, California after twenty-one years and nine months in active commission and struck from the Navy Register on 11 January 1995. Francis Hammond was disposed of by scrapping 31 March 2003.

Awards, citations and campaign ribbons 

References : USS Francis Hammond on NavSource.org

Notes

References

External links 

http://ussfrancishammond.org/
http://ussfrancishammond.com/

 

Knox-class frigates
Ships built in Los Angeles
1968 ships
Cold War frigates and destroyer escorts of the United States